HD 12467 is a single star in the northern circumpolar constellation of Cepheus. It has a white hue and is barely visible to the naked eye with an apparent visual magnitude of 6.05. The distance to this object is 231 light years based on parallax, but it is drifting closer with a heliocentric radial velocity of −9 km/s.

This object is an ordinary A-type main-sequence star with a stellar classification of A1.5V, which indicates it is generating energy through core hydrogen fusion. It is 254 million years old with a relatively high projected rotational velocity of 130 km/s. The star has 1.8 times the mass of the Sun and 1.9 times the Sun's radius. It is radiating 16 times the luminosity of the Sun from its photosphere at an effective temperature of 8,528 K.

The star displays an infrared excess with a signature that suggests it has two debris disks. The inner disk is orbiting  from the host star with a mean temperature of 200 K, while the outer disk is 50 K at a separation of 119 AU.

References 

A-type main-sequence stars
Circumstellar disks

Cepheus (constellation)
Durchmusterung objects
012467
0597
010054